Muscidae are a family of flies found in the superfamily Muscoidea.

Muscidae, some of which are commonly known as house flies or stable flies due to their synanthropy, are worldwide in distribution and contain almost 4,000 described species in over 100 genera.

Most species are not synanthropic. Adults can be predatory, hematophagous, saprophagous, or feed on a number of types of plant and animal exudates. They can be attracted to various substances including sugar, sweat, tears  and blood. Larvae occur in various habitats including decaying vegetation, dry and wet soil, nests of insects and birds, fresh water, and carrion.

The housefly, Musca domestica, is the best known and most important species.

Some, from the genera Hydrotaea and Muscina, are involved in forensic case studies.aces the linkCluichí

Identifying characteristics

The antennae are three-segmented and aristate; vein Rs is two-branched, a frontal suture is present, and the calypters are well developed. The arista is often plumose for the entire length. The hypopleuron is usually without bristles; generally, more than one sternopleural bristle is present. The R5 cell is either parallel-sided or narrowed distally. Vein 2A is short and does not reach the wing margin.

The Fanniidae, which used to be a subfamily (Fanniinae) of the Muscidae, share these characters, but may be separated from them by the absence of the identifying characteristics for the family Fanniidae.

Biology
Larvae mainly develop in decaying plant material or manure.

Health and economic importance

Adults of many species are passive vectors of pathogens for diseases such as typhoid fever, dysentery, anthrax, and African sleeping sickness.

Larvae of some Atherigona species are important pests in cultivation of cereals, like rice and maize.

Evolution
Seven species in six described genera have been recorded from the fossil record. Lambrecht (1980: 369) estimated that the family Muscidae originated as long ago as the Permian, although no fossil record exists for the family any older than the Eocene.

Genera
List of genera according to the Catalogue of Life:

 Adia
 Aethiopomyia
 Afromydaea
 Agenamyia
 Albertinella
 Alluaudinella
 Altimyia
 Amicitia
 Anaphalantus
 Andersonosia
 Anthocoenosia
 Apsil
 Arthurella
 Atelia
 Atherigona
 Auria
 Azelia
 Balioglutum
 Beccimyia
 Biopyrellia
 Bithoracochaeta
 Brachygasterina
 Brevicosta
 Bruceomyia
 Bryantina
 Buccophaonia
 Calliphoroides
 Camptotarsopoda
 Caricea
 Cariocamyia
 Cephalispa
 Chaetagenia
 Chaetopapuaia
 Chaetophaonia
 Charadrella
 Chortinus
 Coenosia
 Cordilura
 Cordiluroides
 Correntosia
 Crucianella
 Curranosia
 Cypselodopteryx
 Cyrtoneurina
 Dasyphora
 Deltotus
 Dichaetomyia
 Dimorphia
 Dolichophaonia
 Drepanocnemis
 Drymeia
 Eginia
 Eginiella
 Eudasyphora
 Exsul
 Fraserella
 Graphomya
 Gymnodia
 Gymnopapuaia
 Haematobia
 Haematobosca
 Haematostoma
 Haroldopsis
 Hebecnema
 Helina
 Helinomydaea
 Heliographa
 Hemichlora
 Hennigiola
 Hennigmyia
 Huckettomyia
 Hydrotaea
 Idiohelina
 Insulamyia
 Itatingamyia
 Lasiopelta
 Limnohelina
 Limnophora
 Limnospila
 Lispacoenosia
 Lispe
 Lispocephala
 Lispoides
 Lophosceles
 Macroeginia
 Macrorchis
 Magma
 Megophyra
 Mesembrina
 Metopomyia
 Microcalyptra
 Mitroplatia
 Morellia
 Mulfordia
 Musca
 Muscina
 Mydaea
 Myiophaea
 Myospila
 Neivamyia
 Neodexiopsis
 Neohelina
 Neolimnophora
 Neomuscina
 Neomyia
 Neorypellia
 Neurotrixa
 Notoschoenomyza
 Nystomyia
 Ochromusca
 Ocypodomyia
 Ophyra
 Opsolasia
 Orchisia
 Oxytonocera
 Pachyceramyia
 Palpibracus
 Papuaia
 Papuaiella
 Paracoenosia
 Paralimnophora
 Parastomoxys
 Parvisquama
 Passeromyia
 Pectiniseta
 Pentacricia
 Phaomusca
 Phaonia
 Phaonidia
 Phaonina
 Philornis
 Pictia
 Pilispina
 Plexiopsis
 Plumispina
 Polietes
 Polietina
 Potamia
 Prohardyia
 Prostomoxys
 Pseudocoenosia
 Pseudohelina
 Pseudoptilolepis
 Psilochaeta
 Pygophora
 Pyrellia
 Pyrellina
 Reinwardtia
 Reynoldsia
 Rhabdoptera
 Rhinomusca
 Rhynchomydaea
 Rypellia
 Sarcopromusca
 Scenetes
 Schoenomyza
 Schoenomyzina
 Scutellomusca
 Sinophaonia
 Souzalopesmyia
 Spanochaeta
 Spathipheromyia
 Spilogona
 Stomopogon
 Stomoxys
 Stygeromyia
 Syllimnophora
 Syngamoptera
 Synthesiomyia
 Tamilomyia
 Tertiuseginia
 Tetramerinx
 Thaumasiochaeta
 Thricops
 Trichomorellia
 Villeneuvia
 Xenomorellia
 Xenomyia
 Xenotachina
 Xestomyia

Types
 Types in the Natural History Museum of Berlin

Images

Further reading
 Identification
 Hennig, W. (1955–64). Muscidae in Erwin Lindner, Die Fliegen der Paläarktischen Region 63b,Schweizerbart,Stuttgart. 
 Huckett, H.C. 1965. The Muscidae of northern Canada, Alaska and Greenland (Diptera). Memoirs of the Entomological Society of Canada 42: 1–369. 23 plates of drawings.
 Séguy, E., 1937, Diptera, family Muscidae. In: P. Wystmann (ed.), Genera Insectorum, Brussels, 205: 604. Includes a key to world genera.
 Shinonaga, S. & Kano, R., 1971, Fauna Japonica Muscidae (Insecta:Diptera), Academia press,242pp.+28Plates. Keys to Eastern Palaearctic genera of several subfamilies.
Gregor, Fr. et al., 2002 The Muscidae (Diptera) of Central Europe, Brno, Folia Biologia, 107.
Biology
Use of DNA in forensic entomology
 Skidmore, P., 1985, The biology of the Muscidae of the world. Junk, Dordrecht. Series entomologica, 29, xiv + 550p.

Links to Genera and species lists
 Palaearctic 
Nearctic
Japan

References

External links

 Family description and images
Image Gallery from Diptera.info
Muscidae
Pictorial atlas explaining technical terms

 
Brachycera families
Taxa named by Pierre André Latreille